is a railway station on the Osaka Loop Line in Osaka, Osaka Prefecture, Japan.

Layout 
 There are an island platform and a side platform with two tracks elevated.

Surroundings
 Ogimachi Station (Sakaisuji Line)
 Kita Ward Office, Osaka
 Tenjimbashisuji Shopping Arcade
 Kids Plaza Osaka
 Kansai Telecasting Corporation

History 
Station numbering was introduced in March 2018 with Teradacho being assigned station number JR-O10.

Adjacent stations

References 

Osaka Loop Line
Railway stations in Osaka Prefecture
Railway stations in Japan opened in 1895